Three Sisters of the Moors is a 1944 American short historical film directed by John Larkin and starring Cedric Hardwicke, Molly Lamont and Lynne Roberts. It portrays the life of the Brontë sisters. The film was released by 20th Century Fox as part of the promotional campaign by the studio for the large-budget Jane Eyre costume drama.

Cast
 Cedric Hardwicke as Reverend Brontë  
 Molly Lamont as Charlotte Brontë  
 Lynne Roberts as Emily Brontë  
 Heather Angel as Anne Brontë  
 Grayce Hampton as Martha 
 Lydia Bilbrook as Mrs. Gaskell  
 Colin Campbell as Clerk 
 Marga Ann Deighton as Townswoman  
 Leslie Denison as Dickens  
 Elspeth Dudgeon as Townswoman 
 Alan Edmiston as Reader  
 Arthur Gould-Porter as Thackery  
 Denis Green as Mr. Smith 
 Thomas Louden as Bookseller  
 Ottola Nesmith as Townswoman  
 Tom Stevenson as Mr. Winton

References

Bibliography
 Quinlan, David. Quinlan's Film Stars. Batsford, 2000.

External links
 

1944 films
1944 short films
1940s historical films
American short films
American historical films
20th Century Fox films
Films set in England
Films set in the 19th century
Biographical films about writers
Films about siblings
Films about sisters
American black-and-white films
Brontë family
1940s English-language films
1940s American films